The Social Democrats have since the 2007 municipal reform held the mayor's position in Lolland municipality. They've always been the largest party by number of seats, however both them and Venstre had 9 seats in the period of 2014-2017.

In the previous election the Social Democrats had won 11 seats, 6 more than second-place Venstre. The traditional red bloc had therefore 13 of the 25 seats, and a majority. This led to Holger Schou Rasmussen from the Social Democrats becoming mayor. He would stand for re-election in this election, and for a third term. It was expected that he would have success.

Once again the Social Democrats would become the biggest party, and ended up only one short of an absolute majority. Fellow red bloc parties, Green Left and Red–Green Alliance, would decrease their vote share by 1.2% and 0.2% respectively, however none of them lost a seat. Therefore, there were 14 red seats, and Holger Schou Rasmussen was in pole position to win a third term. It was eventually confirmed that he would continue as mayor.

In November 2022, Eric Steffensen switched party affiliation from Danish People's Party to the Social Democrats, and this means that the Social Democrats currently holds 13 seats and an absolute majority in Lolland's municipal council.

Electoral system
For elections to Danish municipalities, a number varying from 9 to 31 are chosen to be elected to the municipal council. The seats are then allocated using the D'Hondt method and a closed list proportional representation.
Lolland Municipality had 25 seats in 2021

Unlike in Danish General Elections, in elections to municipal councils, electoral alliances are allowed.

Electoral alliances  

Electoral Alliance 1

Electoral Alliance 2

Electoral Alliance 3

Electoral Alliance 4

Results

Notes

References 

Lolland